Werner Stutz (born 10 April 1962) is a Swiss racing cyclist. He rode in the 1991 Tour de France.

References

External links
 

1962 births
Living people
Swiss male cyclists
Place of birth missing (living people)
Tour de Suisse stage winners